Half-Life is a 2008 movie directed by Jennifer Phang, starring Sanoe Lake, Julia Nickson-Soul, Leonardo Nam, Ben Redgrave, Lee Marks, James Eckhouse, Susan Ruttan and Alexander Agate. The film premiered in the 2008 Sundance Film Festival and has since been touring the American and international film festivals circuits. It premiered internationally in the Tokyo International Film Festival in competition, and then in Europe at the Mannheim-Heidelberg International Film Festival, also in competition. Half-Life was the opening night film for the International Women's Film Festival in Seoul, Korea. The film made a theatrical debut on December 1, 2009 in selected cities.

Plot
Set in the near future amidst accelerating global cataclysms, the film follows a troubled young boy, Tim Wu (Agate), and his jaded older sister, Pam (Lake) as they use their imaginations (depicted as surreal animated sequences) to escape their broken lives after their airplane pilot father suddenly and unexpectedly abandons them. Their mother Saura (Nickson-Soul) struggles to make ends meet and move on with her life while involved with her manipulative boyfriend, Wendell (Redgrave). Pam, who works cleaning airplanes, seeks solace in her friend Scott (Nam), who struggles to be accepted as gay by his willfully ignorant, and staunchly Christian, adoptive parents (Eckhouse and Ruttan). Meanwhile, Tim's schoolteacher and Scott's lover, Jonah (Marks), attempts to reach out to Tim.

Awards
The film has won the Gen Art Acura Grand Jury Prize 2008, the Asian American International Film Festival Best Feature Film Award, the San Francisco International Asian American Film Festival Best Narrative Feature Award, and the Visionary Award at Calgary's Fairy Tales International. It was also nominated for the Tokyo Grand Prix at the Tokyo International Film Festival.

External links
 
 

Films about Asian Americans
2008 films
2000s English-language films
American independent films
2000s American films